Vladimir Ivanovich Firsov (1937 – 17 November 2011) was a  Soviet and Russian poet and translator. He was a member of the CPSU since 1970.

For many years, he was a member of the editorial board Molodaya Gvardiya.

He was the author of more than 30 books of poetry and poems. He translated the poems into Russian from Bulgarian, Moldovan, Ukrainian, Chuvash and other languages.

He died on 17 November 2011, and is buried in Troyekurovskoye Cemetery in Moscow.

Awards 
 Order of the October Revolution
 Order of the Red Banner of Labour
 Order of the Badge of Honour (twice)
 Order "For Merit to the Fatherland"  4th class (2008)
 Lenin Komsomol Prize (1968)
 Prize of the Russian Government in the field of culture (2009)

References

External links
 Статья о Ф. И. Фирсове в Большом энциклопедическом словаре
 Некролог в газете «Слово» за подписью Виктора Линника
 Книги В. И. Фирсова на сайте OZON.ru
 Стихотворения Владимира Фирсова из книги лирики «Два солнца»
 Чувство Родины. Стихи и поэмы

1937 births
2011 deaths
Soviet poets
Soviet male writers
20th-century Russian male writers
Russian male poets
Russian-language poets
Soviet translators
20th-century Russian translators
Russian editors
Russian magazine editors
Socialist realism writers
Soviet editors
Burials in Troyekurovskoye Cemetery
Russian lyricists
Communist Party of the Soviet Union members
Recipients of the Lenin Komsomol Prize
Date of birth missing
Place of birth missing
Place of death missing
Maxim Gorky Literature Institute alumni